The 2000 New Zealand Grand Prix event for open wheel racing cars was held at Pukekohe Park Raceway near Auckland on 2 December 2000. It was the forty-sixth New Zealand Grand Prix and was open to Formula Holden cars. The event was also the final race of the 2000 Tasman Cup. It would prove to be the final race in the revived Tasman Series established in 1998 for Formula Holden. No 2001 series followed.

The race was won by New Zealand driver Andy Booth driving a Reynard 95D belonging to the Arthur Abrahams-run NRC International. Booth's team mate Matt Halliday finished second ahead of Australian driver Paul Dumbrell finished third.

Classification

Qualifying

Race

References

New Zealand Grand Prix
Grand Prix
Formula Holden
New Zealand